His Majesty's Trawler Bredon (Pennant Number T223) was a Hill class naval trawler that served as an anti-submarine escort trawler during the Second World War.

Only 2 members of her crew complement of 43 survived.

References
Bredon at allied warships at Uboat.net
Bredon at ships hit at Uboat.net

 

Ships built on the Humber
Anti-submarine trawlers of the Royal Navy
World War II shipwrecks in the Atlantic Ocean
1941 ships
Ships sunk by German submarines in World War II
Maritime incidents in February 1943